Rostislav Vondruška (born 24 March 1961) is a Czech politician. He was the Minister for Regional Development in the caretaker government of Jan Fischer.

References

1961 births
Regional Development ministers of the Czech Republic
Politicians from Kladno
Living people
Czech Social Democratic Party Government ministers